Sir Gervase Clifton, 1st Baronet, K.B. (25 November 1587 – 28 June 1666) was an English politician who sat in the House of Commons at various times between 1614 and 1666. He supported the Royalist cause in the English Civil War. He was educated at St John's College, Cambridge.

Political career
In 1603, at the English coronation of King James I, Clifton was made a Knight of the Order of the Bath. He became a Justice of the Peace for Nottinghamshire in 1609, remaining until 1646. In 1611, he was third on the list of creations for the new order of baronet. He was active in local Nottinghamshire and national politics in both the reign of James I and Charles I. He was High Sheriff of Nottinghamshire in 1610 and High Steward of East Retford from 1616 to 1647. During the reign of King James he was elected Member of Parliament for Nottinghamshire in 1614, 1621, 1624 and 1625. He was County Treasurer from 1625 to 1626, and Deputy Lieutenant from 1626 to 1642. In 1626, he was elected MP for Nottingham and in 1628, he was re-elected MP for Nottinghamshire in 1628. He sat until 1629 when King Charles decided to rule without parliament for eleven years.  
   
In November 1640, Clifton was elected MP for East Retford in the Long Parliament.  He took up arms in the King's cause in the Civil War. He was a Commissioner for the King at Newark and Oxford, and a Commissioner of Array for Lincolnshire and Nottinghamshire in 1642. When King Charles called for members of the Long Parliament loyal to him to meet in session Oxford Clifton did so and was disabled from sitting in parliament at Westminster. With the defeat of the Royalist cause in 1646 and the capture of the King, Clifton lost his political influence both nationally and locally. He was declared a "delinquent" and fined £7,625 (equivalent to £ in ) . By the time sequestration of his estates was ended in 1650 he had paid off about half of the money. He was not active in politics again until after the restoration of the monarchy in 1660.

After the Restoration he regained his influence in Nottinghamshire and, from 1660, served Justice of the Peace for Nottinghamshire, High Steward of East Retford and Deputy Lieutenant. He was re-elected MP for Nottinghamshire in 1661 for the Cavalier Parliament. He held all these positions until his death, aged 78, in 1666.

Family

Clifton was born to his mother Lady Winifred Thorold three months after the death of his father Sir George Clifton, in 1587. The next year, with the death of his grandfather, Sir Gervase Clifton, he inherited the Clifton estates in Nottinghamshire. His guardians were his uncle, William Thorold, and Lord Burghley, although his early care fell to his maternal grandmother Lady Anne Thorold. Later he was educated at St. John's College, Cambridge, and at the Inner Temple.

Clifton was married seven times and had thirteen children.

He married Lady Penelope Rich (died 26 October 1613), daughter of Robert Rich, 1st Earl of Warwick, and Lady Penelope Devereux. This marriage produced one son:
Sir Gervase Clifton, 2nd Baronet (ca.1612–1676)

He married Lady Frances Clifford (died 1627), daughter of Francis Clifford, 4th Earl of Cumberland, and Grisold Hughes. This marriage produced six children
Margaret Clifton (d. Feb 1697/98)
Frances Clifton
Anne Clifton
Lettice Clifton (d. 1659)
Elizabeth Clifton
Clifford Clifton (1626–1670)

He married Mary Egioke (died 1630), daughter of John Egioke of Egioke Manor, Inkberrow, Worcestershire, by his wife Anne, daughter of Nicholas Huband, of Ipsley, Warwickshire.

He married Isobel Meek (died 1637).

He married Anne South (died 1639), daughter of Sir Francis South of Kelstern, Lincolnshire.

He married Jane Eyre (died 1655), daughter of Anthony Eyre of Laughton-en-le-Morthen, Nottinghamshire, and Rampton, Nottinghamshire. This marriage produced four children:
Jane Clifton
Charles Clifton
Mary Clifton
Robert Clifton (b. 1641) – eldest son became Sir Gervase Clifton, 4th Baronet

Lastly, he married Lady Alice Hastings, daughter of Henry Hastings, 5th Earl of Huntingdon, and Lady Elizabeth Stanley, on 17 December 1656 at St. Andrew Undershaft, London.

Notes

References
Bruce, Rosslyn (1906).  The Clifton Book, Chapter III: The Cliftons of Clifton. Retrieved 31 August 2009
Biography of Sir Gervase Clifton, 1st Baronet (1587-1666), Manuscripts & Special Collections, University of Nottingham. Retrieved 31 August 2009. Sources used:
  P. R. Seddon, 'Sir Gervase Clifton and the Government of Nottinghamshire 1609-1640', in Transactions of the Thoroton Society, vol. XCVII, 1993, 88-98
 Basil Duke Henning (ed), 'Sir Gervase Clifton', in The House of Commons, 1660-1690 (London: Published for the History of Parliament Trust by Secker & Warburg, 1983)
 P. R. Seddon, 'Marriage and Inheritance in the Clifton Family during the 17th century', in Transactions of the Thoroton Society, vol. LXXXIV, 1980, 33-43
 A. H. Tricomi, 'Identifying Sir Gervase Clifton, The Addressee of [John] Marston's Letter, 1607', in Notes and Queries, 222 (1977), 202-203
 W. H. G. Flood, 'A John Marston Letter' [to Sir Gervase Clifton], in The Review of English Studies 4 (1928), 887-88
 F. W. Dobson, 'Note on a Letter of Cardinal Richelieu in the Clifton MSS', in Transactions of the Thoroton Society 16 (1912), 155-158
 Lady E. M. Bruce, 'Ancient Documents and Letters [of Sir Gervase Clifton] at Clifton Hall', in Transactions of the Thoroton Society 15 (1911), 161-173

 
 
 

1587 births
1666 deaths
Cavaliers
Knights of the Bath
Alumni of St John's College, Cambridge
Baronets in the Baronetage of England
People from Nottinghamshire
High Sheriffs of Nottinghamshire
Deputy Lieutenants of Nottinghamshire
English MPs 1661–1679
English MPs 1614
English MPs 1621–1622
English MPs 1624–1625
English MPs 1625
English MPs 1626
English MPs 1628–1629
English MPs 1640–1648
English knights
Gervase